Streetcars in Minneapolis may refer to:
 Twin City Rapid Transit Company, which ran a streetcar system in the Twin Cities until 1954
 Existing and proposed Light Rail lines in the Twin Cities:
Blue Line
Green Line
Southwest Corridor
Northwest/Bottineau Boulevard Transitway
Robert Street Corridor
 The proposed, modern streetcar system in Minneapolis